Club for Five (CFF) is a contemporary a cappella group from Finland. They are known for their unique singing style. Club for Five was founded in Helsinki in 2001.

The members of the band are musicians with diverse and extensive musical backgrounds: Maija Sariola (soprano), Susanna Hietala (alto), Jouni Kannisto (tenor), Juha Viitala (baritone) and Tuukka Haapaniemi (bass). Their repertoire (both Finnish and English) is mainly self-arranged and/or self-composed pop music with influences from a variety of musical genres.

Club for Five performs mainly in Finland, but has also held concerts elsewhere in Europe, as well as Asia. The band has also performed with distinguished ensembles, such as the American vocal group The Manhattan Transfer and the Finnish Radio Symphony Orchestra. Their première in North America was at Festival 500 in St. John's, Newfoundland and Labrador on July 8, 2009.

Discography

Albums

Live albums
2010: In Concert - You're The Voice (Warner Music Finland)

Singles

Sources

External links
Club For Five Official Website (English)
MySpace - Club For Five
Spotify Page

Finnish musical groups
Professional a cappella groups